Robert O. Cook (September 27, 1903 – November 9, 1995) was an American sound engineer. He was nominated for three Academy Awards in the category Sound Recording. He worked on nearly 100 films between 1946 and 1977.

Selected filmography
 The Parent Trap (1961)
 Bon Voyage! (1962)
 Mary Poppins (1964)

References

External links

1903 births
1995 deaths
American audio engineers
People from Manitowoc, Wisconsin
20th-century American engineers
Walt Disney Animation Studios people
Academy Award for Technical Achievement winners